The 2019 Women's Lacrosse European Championship was the 11th edition of this tournament. It was held in Netanya, Israel, from 15 to 25 July 2019.

16 teams joined the tournament. England is the defending champion.

Format
Teams were divided into three groups, being the group A composed by the six best teams in the previous edition. The four first qualified teams would join the championship playoffs.

The rest of the teams would need to achieve a 4–0 balance in their groups for being able to join the playoffs.

The European Championships will also be serving as a qualifier for the FIL World Cup for the first time. 15 of the 16 teams competing in Israel this summer are expected to qualify for the next World Cup.

Group stage

Group A

Group B

Group C

Playoffs

Championship bracket

5th position bracket

9th position bracket

13th position group

Final standings

References

External links
Official website 

International sports competitions hosted by Israel
European Lacrosse Championship
European Lacrosse Championship
Women's lacrosse in Israel
European
Women's international lacrosse competitions
European Lacrosse Championships